Chrysallida boucheti is a species of sea snail, a marine gastropod mollusk in the family Pyramidellidae, the pyrams and their allies. The species is one of multiple species within the Chrysallida genus of gastropods.

Distribution
This species occurs in the Irving and Hyères Seamounts, Northern Atlantic Ocean, between 670 and 1060 m depth.

Habitat
The species is known from seamounts and underwater knolls.

References

External links
 To CLEMAM
 To Encyclopedia of Life

boucheti
Gastropods described in 1999